Rīgas Futbola Skola (Latvian for Riga's football school) is a Latvian women's football club from Riga. The women play in the top level Latvian Women's League and won the championship in 2013 and 2014.
They won their third title in 2015.

Titles
Latvian Women's League:
Winners (8): 2013, 2014, 2015, 2016, 2017, 2018, 2020, 2021

Current squad

 Head coach: Karīna Šakurova

UEFA competition record

References

External links
Official website

Football clubs in Riga
Women's football clubs in Latvia